Alexey Maksimovich Nikitin (1876-1939) was a Russian politician who was the last Ministers of Internal Affairs of the Russian Provisional Government from 15 September - 7 November 1917.

References

1876 births
1939 deaths
Politicians from the Russian Empire